The 2020–21 Oud-Heverlee Leuven season was the club's 19th season in existence and its first season back in the top flight of Belgian football. In addition to the domestic league, OH Leuven participated in this season's edition of the Belgian Cup. The season covered the period from 3 August 2020 to 30 June 2021, but in reality OH Leuven's season de facto ended already mid-April upon completion of the regular season, with OH Leuven not qualified for any of the playoffs.

Players
This section lists players who were in Oud-Heveree Leuven's first team squad at any point during the 2020–21 season and appeared at least once on the match sheet (possibly as unused substitute)
The symbol ℒ indicates a player who is on loan from another club
The symbol ¥ indicates a youngster

Did not appear on match sheet
The following players were listed as part of Oud-Heveree Leuven's first team squad during the 2020–21 season, but never appeared on the match sheet

Transfers

Summer: In

Summer: Out

Winter: In

Winter: Out

Pre-season and friendlies

Competitions

Overview

Belgian First Division A

League table

Results summary

Results by round

Matches
The league fixtures were announced on 8 July 2020.

Belgian Cup

Statistics

Appearances
Players with no appearances not included in the list.

Goalscorers

Assists

References

External links

Oud-Heverlee Leuven
OH Leuven